Solidago altiplanities, the high plains goldenrod, is a plant species native to the high-altitude plains of Oklahoma and the Texas Panhandle, often found on ridges and escarpments.

Solidago altiplanities is an herb up to 1 m (39 inches) tall, spreading by underground rhizomes. One plant can produce as many as 350 small yellow flower heads in a broad, conical array.

References

External links
Photo of herbarium specimen at Missouri Botanical Garden, collected in Oklahoma in 1981, isotype of Solidago altiplanities

altiplanities
Flora of Texas
Plants described in 1983
Flora of Oklahoma
Flora without expected TNC conservation status